Fashion Row is a 1923 American silent drama film directed by Robert Z. Leonard and starring Mae Murray in a dual role, Earle Foxe, and Freeman Wood. The film involves two Russian sisters emigrate to America. One tries to hide her peasant origins and rises in high society, while the other remains closer to her roots.

Plot
As described in a film magazine review, Russian Olga Farinova becomes a famous actress in New York City. Under the pretense of being of noble birth, she weds a young millionaire. When her sister Zita arrives, she is at first disowned by Olga. A message declaring that Zita is ill lures Olga to the East Side. Olga is trapped there by an old suitor seeking revenge, shot, and dies in her husband's embrace. Zita is then adopted by the millionaire's family.

Cast

References

Bibliography
 Michael G. Ankerich (2012). Mae Murray: The Girl with the Bee-stung Lips. University Press of Kentucky.

External links

Still at www.hollywoodpinups.com
Lobby card at www.gettyimages.com
Stills at silenthollywood.com

1923 films
1923 drama films
1920s English-language films
American silent feature films
Silent American drama films
Films directed by Robert Z. Leonard
American black-and-white films
Metro Pictures films
Tiffany Pictures films
1920s American films